Harold James Nash (14 May 1914 – 7 March 1984) was an Australian rules footballer who played with Geelong in the Victorian Football League (VFL).

Notes

External links 

1914 births
1984 deaths
Australian rules footballers from Victoria (Australia)
Geelong Football Club players